S8mm may refer to:

 Super 8 film
 Single-8 film